Tower is a 2012 Canadian drama film, written and directed by Kazik Radwanski. Radwanski's feature directorial debut, the film follows a socially awkward Torontonian named Derek. The film had its world premiere at the 2012 Locarno Film Festival, followed by its North American premiere at the 2012 Toronto International Film Festival.

Cast 

 Derek Bogart as Derek, a socially awkward loner motivated by his personal obsessions.

Critical response
The film was met with critical acclaim upon its release. The Wall Street Journal proclaimed it as "thoroughly compelling, juxtaposing idiosyncratic camerawork with raw insight into the sort of person everyone knows", while Eric Kohn of IndieWire described the protagonist as "an awkward loner made mesmerizing", and Scott Foundas for the Village Voice described it as "a Sisyphus for the Asperger’s era".

Now named Tower one of the "Top 25 Toronto Films" of all time.

References

External links

2012 films
Canadian drama films
English-language Canadian films
Films directed by Kazik Radwanski
2010s English-language films
2010s Canadian films